Sarcoptes equi is a species of mites. It occurs in horses and riders; they can suffer an itchy skin disorder, a form of scabies.

References 

Sarcoptiformes
Parasitic acari
Parasites of equines
Parasitic arthropods of mammals